Sığdaş (also, Sigdash and Sygdash) is a village and municipality in the Masally Rayon of Azerbaijan.  It has a population of 1,474.

References 

Populated places in Masally District